1956 presidential election may refer to:

 1956 Bolivian presidential election
 1956 Salvadoran presidential election
 1956 Finnish presidential election
 1956 Icelandic presidential election
 1956 South Korean presidential election
 1956 United States presidential election